Noud Stempels  ( – ) was a Dutch footballer. He was part of the Netherlands national football team, playing 3 matches. He played his first match on 29 March 1908. He was also part of the Dutch squad for the football tournament at the 1908 Summer Olympics, but he did not play in any matches.

See also
 List of Dutch international footballers

References

External links

1882 births
1970 deaths
Dutch footballers
Netherlands international footballers
People from Rijswijk
H.V. & C.V. Quick players
Association football midfielders
Footballers from South Holland